R71 may refer to:
 R71 (South Africa), a road
 R71 (star)
 2009 Washington Referendum 71
 BMW R71, a motorcycle on which the IMZ-Ural is based
 , a destroyer of the Royal Navy
 , an aircraft carrier of the Royal Navy
 Plant small nucleolar RNA R71